Silver Creek High School is a high school serving grades 9-12 located in Sellersburg, Indiana. It is part of the Silver Creek School Corporation. The school colors are orange and blue, and the mascot is the Dragons.  Silver Creek's athletic teams are part of the 10-school Mid-Southern Conference.

See also
 List of high schools in Indiana

References

External links
 Silver Creek High School website
 Silver Creek School Corporation website

Public high schools in Indiana
Schools in Clark County, Indiana